Paper Airplane is an album by Alison Krauss and Union Station. Released on April 12, 2011, it was Krauss's 14th album and her first release with Union Station since Lonely Runs Both Ways in 2004. It includes cover versions of "My Opening Farewell" and "Dimming of the Day", originally recorded by Jackson Browne and Richard Thompson, respectively.

The album's lead single, the title track, was released to country music radio and Adult album alternative radio on March 28, 2011, but failed to chart.

The album was engineered and mixed by Mike Shipley, whom Krauss persuaded to return to engineering after a 10‑year absence.

Reception

Critical

Thom Jurek of AllMusic gave Paper Airplane four-stars, describing it as melancholy, with songs revolving around themes of trial and perseverance. He also praised the cover versions of "Dimming of the Day" and "My Opening Farewell". He considered the album "polished yet authentic".

Andrew Greer of Christianity Today also honored Paper Airplane with four stars, finding it "an exquisite eleven-song canon," and added: "Though their haunts are heavy-hearted, a tangible hope pervades Airplane, attesting to the band's spiritual sensitivity even without the band's usual faith song standout." The album won Grammys for Best Bluegrass Album and Best Engineered Album, Non-Classical.

Commercial
Paper Airplane sold approximately 83,000 copies during its first week of release, making it Krauss's first number one album on the Billboard Top Country Albums chart. It is also the highest entry for Krauss on the Billboard 200, where it debuted at number three. Raising Sand, Krauss's collaboration with Robert Plant, reached number two on the Billboard 200 upon its release in 2007. In addition to these charts, it also debuted at number one on the Billboard Top Bluegrass Albums and number one on Billboard Folk Albums.  The album has sold 384,000 copies in the United States as of November 2016.

Paper Airplane was a minor hit in Europe, debuting in the top forty of several European countries, such as the Norwegian Albums Chart. It  became Krauss' most successful album in the UK, reaching number 11 on the UK Albums Chart (overtaking 2009's compilation Essential Alison Krauss, which reached number 13) and earning a silver certification from the BPI.

Track listing

Personnel
 Alison Krauss – lead vocals, background vocals, fiddle
 Dan Tyminski – lead vocals, background vocals, acoustic guitar, mandolin
 Ron Block – acoustic guitar, banjo
 Jerry Douglas – background vocals, dobro 
 Barry Bales – background vocals, upright bass
 Mike Shipley – engineer, mixer
 Brad Blackwood – mastering engineer

Charts

Weekly charts

Year-end charts

Certifications and sales

References

2011 albums
Alison Krauss & Union Station albums
Rounder Records albums
Grammy Award for Best Engineered Album, Non-Classical